Moonmoon Banerjee, also known as Mahua is an Indian television actress whose role of Sampada Basu in Ekta Kapoor's popular soap Kasautii Zindagii Kay for Star Plus brought popularity and appreciation. Apart from it she acted as Panna from Sasural Genda Phool, Asha Bose in Kuch Rang Pyar Ke Aise Bhi  for Sony Entertainment Television and Damayanti in Ek Tha Raja Ek Thi Rani via Zee TV. Banerjee most recently starred on Star Bharat's Muskaan where she played Gayatri Singh. She played Uma Rawat in Muskuraane Ki Vajah Tum Ho.

Personal life 
Moonmoon Banerjee is married to producer Neeraj Sharma and they have a four-year-old son Rumeer.

Movies

Television

References

External links
 

Living people
Actresses from Kolkata
Actresses in Hindi cinema
Actresses in Bengali cinema
Indian television actresses
Indian soap opera actresses
Actresses in Hindi television
21st-century Indian actresses
Year of birth missing (living people)